Käbin is an Estonian surname. Notable people with the surname include:
 (1921–2003), surgeon and medical scientist
Johannes Käbin (Ivan Käbin, 1905–1999), Soviet Estonian politician
Rait Käbin (born 1981), Estonian basketball coach and former professional basketball player
Tiit Käbin (1937–2011), lawyer and politician

See also
Kabin

Estonian-language surnames